The Stalin Bloc – For the USSR, known before January 1999 as the Front of the Working People, Army and Youth for the USSR (abbr. FTR), was a coalition of communist political parties in Russia running together for the 1999 elections of the State Duma.

This coalition was composed by many small radical political parties including "Labour Russia" led by Viktor Anpilov, Union of Officers led by Stanislav Terekhov, "Union" led by G.I. Tikhonov, the Peoples Patriotic Union of Youth led by I.O. Maliarov, Union of Workers of Moscow, Bolshevik Platform CPSU, All-Union Communist Party Bolsheviks, Russian Association of Miners Invalids, Congress of Soviet Women, All Union Society for studying the legacy of Stalin and the Vanguard of Red Youth.

Aside from the leaders of the above movements, the Stalin Bloc included Joseph Stalin's well-known grandson, Yevgeny Dzhugashvili, a retired air force colonel.

The Bloc obtained 0.61% and 404,274 votes in the 1999 Duma Election.

References

External links
List of Candidates 
Party's flag
about Viktor Anpilov and the Bloc 
about the composition of the Bloc

1999 establishments in Russia
Anti-revisionist organizations
Defunct communist parties in Russia
Defunct left-wing political party alliances
Defunct political party alliances in Russia
Neo-Sovietism
Neo-Stalinist organizations
Organizations established in 1999
Russia